The following were the events of Gymnastics for the year 2013 throughout the world.

Artistic gymnastics
 March 2 – December 7: Artistic Gymnastics World Cup
March 2 at  Worcester
Men's overall winner:  Jacob Dalton
Women's overall winner:  Katelyn Ohashi
 March 16 & 17 at  La Roche-sur-Yon (Individual apparatus)
March 21 – 24 at  Cottbus (Individual apparatus)
March 27 – 29 at  Doha (Individual apparatus)
April 6 & 7 at  Tokyo
April 26 – 28 at  Ljubljana (Individual apparatus)
June 21 – 23 at  Anadia
September 13 – 15 at  Osijek
November 30 – December 1 at  Stuttgart
December 7 at  Glasgow
 April 17 – 21: 5th 2013 European Artistic Gymnastics Championships in Moscow
 won both gold medal and overall medal tallies.
 September 30 – October 6: 2013 World Artistic Gymnastics Championships in Antwerp
 won the gold medal tally. The  won the overall medal tally.

Rhythmic gymnastics
 8 February – 18 August: FIG Rhythmic Gymnastics World Cup
8–10 February at  Tartu
All-round overall winner:  Ganna Rizatdinova
Ball winner:  Melitina Staniouta
Clubs winner:  Melitina Staniouta
Hoop winner:  Ganna Rizatdinova
Ribbon winner:  Melitina Staniouta
April 3 – 7 at  Lisbon
All-round overall winner:  Margarita Mamun
Ball winner:  Margarita Mamun
Clubs winner: Margarita Mamun
Hoop winner:  Margarita Mamun
Ribbon winner:  Margarita Mamun
April 19 – 21 at  Bucharest
All-round overall winner:  Melitina Staniouta
Ball winner:  Melitina Staniouta
Clubs winner:  Daria Svatkovskaya
Hoop winner:  Maria Titova
Ribbon winner:  Melitina Staniouta and  Daria Svatkovskaya in a tie
April 26 – 28 at  Pesaro
All-round overall winner:  Melitina Staniouta
Ball winner:  Melitina Staniouta
Clubs winner: Melitina Staniouta
Hoop winner:  Daria Svatkovskaya
Ribbon winner:  Melitina Staniouta
May 4 & 5 at  Sofia
All-round overall winner:  Yana Kudryavtseva
Ball winner:  Margarita Mamun
Clubs winner: Yana Kudryavtseva
Hoop winner:  Yana Kudryavtseva
Ribbon winner:  Sylvia Miteva
May 10 – 12 at  Corbeil-Essonnes
All-round overall winner:  Ganna Rizatdinova
Ball winner:  Margarita Mamun
Clubs winner: Ganna Rizatdinova
Hoop winner:  Margarita Mamun
Ribbon winner:  Margarita Mamun
May 17 – 19 at  Minsk
All-round overall winner:  Yana Kudryavtseva
Ball winner:  Yana Kudryavtseva
Clubs winner: Melitina Staniouta
Hoop winner:  Daria Svatkovskaya
Ribbon winner:  Melitina Staniouta
May 31 – June 2: 2013 European Championships in  Vienna, Austria
Ball winner:  Yana Kudryavtseva
Clubs winner: Yana Kudryavtseva
Hoop winner:  Daria Svatkovskaya
Ribbon winner:  Margarita Mamun
August 17 – 18 at  St. Petersburg
All-around overall winner:  Margarita Mamun
Group all-around winner: 
Ball winner:  Yana Kudryavtseva
Clubs winner:  Margarita Mamun
Hoop winner:  Margarita Mamun
Ribbon winner:  Margarita Mamun
Ten Clubs winner: 
Two ribbons and three balls winner: 
 August 28 – September 1: 2013 World Rhythmic Gymnastics Championships in  Kyiv, Ukraine
  wins both the gold and overall medal tallies.
All-around overall winner:  Yana Kudryavtseva
Group all-around winner: 
Ball winner:  Margarita Mamun
Clubs winner: Yana Kudryavtseva and Margarita Mamun in a tie
Hoop winner:  Ganna Rizatdinova
Ribbon winner:  Yana Kudryavtseva
Ten Clubs winner: 
Two ribbons and three balls winner:

Trampolining
 September 6 – October 5: FIG Trampolining World Cup
 September 6 & 7 at  Loulé
Men's individual trampoline:  Nikita Fedorenko
Women's individual trampoline:  Rosie MacLennan
Men's synchronized:  Sergei Azarian / Mikhail Melnik
Women's synchronized:  Rosie MacLennan / Samantha Sendel
Men's individual tumbling:  Alexander Bezyulev
Women's individual tumbling:  Anastasiia Isupova
 September 13 & 14 at  Valladolid
Men's individual trampoline:  Gao Lei
Women's individual trampoline:  Zhong Xingping
Men's synchronized:  Nikita Fedorenko / Dmitry Ushakov
Women's synchronized:  Reina Satake / Chisato Doihata
 October 4 & 5 at  Odense
Men's individual trampoline:  Dong Dong
Women's individual trampoline:  Bryony Page
Men's synchronized:  Xiao TU / Dong Dong
Women's synchronized:  Rosie MacLennan / Samantha Sendel
Men's individual tumbling:  Tagir Murtazaev
Women's individual tumbling:  JIA Fangfang 
 November 7 – 10: 2013 Trampoline World Championships in  Sofia
 Men's individual trampoline:  Dong Dong
 Women's individual trampoline:  Rosannagh MacLennan
 Men's individual team trampoline: 
 Women's individual team trampoline: 
 Men's synchronized trampoline: 
 Women's synchronized trampoline: 
 Men's individual tumbling:  Kristof Willerton
 Women's individual tumbling:  JIA Fangfang
 Men's individual team tumbling: 
 Women's individual team tumbling: 
 Men's individual double mini-trampoline:  Mikhail Zalomin
 Women's individual double mini-trampoline:  Kristle Lowell
 Men's individual team double mini-trampoline: 
 Women's individual team double mini-trampoline:

References

 
Gymnastics by year